Arrade leucocosmalis, the garden snout, is a moth of the family Erebidae. The species was first described by Francis Walker in 1863. It is found in Victoria, Australia.

The wingspan is about 20 mm.

References

External links
 

Hypeninae
Moths of Australia